The Grand Rapids Business Journal is a bi-weekly business newspaper concentrating on Grand Rapids, Michigan and the surrounding area. It is published by Crain Communications who acquired it from Gemini Media in 2022. Crain acquired MiBiz later the same year.

The Grand Rapids Business Journal features regular columns such as Street Talk, Change-Ups, Sales Moves and a calendar of business events. The newspaper also includes a weekly "focus section" on various aspects of business, including commercial real estate, finance, manufacturing, communication, education and others. These focus sections typically include a "top business list" related to the topic.

Also published is an annual "Book Of Lists"—a compilation of the various business lists published through the year, and an annual Giving Guide.

The GRBJ was first published in September 1983 as a monthly spin-off of the Grand Rapids Magazine. Its "All Business All The Time" slogan quickly earned a following. The publication became a weekly in January 1986.

References

External links 
Official Website

Newspapers published in Michigan
Mass media in Grand Rapids, Michigan
Weekly newspapers published in the United States
Business newspapers published in the United States